Clarence Lamar McHan (December 16, 1932 – November 23, 1998) was an American football player and coach. He played professionally for ten seasons as a quarterback in the National Football League (NFL) for the Chicago Cardinals, Green Bay Packers, Baltimore Colts, and San Francisco 49ers.

Early years
Born and raised in Lake Village, Arkansas, McHan graduated from its Lakeside High School and played college football at the University of Arkansas in Fayetteville where he was a single-wing tailback. He was ninth in the 1953 Heisman Trophy balloting and played in the Blue-Gray Game in December and the College All-Star Game in Chicago in August 1954.

Playing career
McHan was the second overall selection of the 1954 NFL draft, taken by the Chicago Cardinals. He played with the Cardinals for five seasons, through 1958, but was suspended and fined by the team in November 1956 for insubordination.

McHan was traded to the Green Bay Packers in May 1959, under first-year head coach and general manager Vince Lombardi. In 1959, he was the starting quarterback for the first six games, then had a minor leg injury, and was replaced by future hall of fame quarterback Bart Starr. McHan started and won several games in 1960, then was traded to the Baltimore Colts in March 1961, and played behind Johnny Unitas. He was waived by the Colts in September 1963 and was picked up by San Francisco. He played briefly with the Toronto Argonauts of the Canadian Football League (CFL) in 1965, winning the starting job at training camp, only to be cut after losing his first two starts.

Coaching career
After retiring from football, McHan became an assistant coach at Northern Arizona University in Flagstaff, and at the University of Texas at Arlington. He finished out his coaching career back in the NFL with the New Orleans Saints from 1974 to 1984 under three different head coaches: John North, Dick Nolan, and Bum Phillips. (He was not on the staff of Hank Stram in 1976 and 1977.)

Death
McHan died at age 65 in Jefferson, Louisiana, a suburb west of New Orleans, of a heart attack in 1998. He is buried at Garden of Memories in Metairie.

References

External links
 
 Sports Reference – collegiate statistics – Lamar McHan
 

1932 births
1998 deaths
American football quarterbacks
American players of Canadian football
Arkansas Razorbacks football players
Baltimore Colts players
Chicago Cardinals players
Green Bay Packers players
New Orleans Saints coaches
Northern Arizona Lumberjacks football coaches
San Francisco 49ers players
Texas–Arlington Mavericks football coaches
Toronto Argonauts players
People from Lake Village, Arkansas
Players of American football from Arkansas